Dóm tér (literally: Cathedral Square) is a large town square in Szeged, Hungary. It is one of the largest squares in Hungary (about 12,000 m²). The name Dóm tér derived from Votive Church of Szeged, which lies on the square. It was built from 1929 to 1932 with the surrounding university buildings. The square is also home to the medieval Dömötör Tower.

Sources
Déry Attila, Merényi Ferenc: Magyar építészet, Budapest, Urbino, 2000.  Dóm tér p. 190

Szeged
Squares in Hungary
Buildings and structures in Csongrád-Csanád County
Tourist attractions in Csongrád-Csanád County